The ISU World Standings and Season's World Ranking are the objective merit-based method used by the International Skating Union (ISU) for single & pair skating and ice dance, as well as synchronized skating.

The ISU Council implemented the former World Standings system for single & pair skating and ice dance for several seasons before 2010. The World Standings system for synchronized skating and the Season's World Ranking were not been implemented until 2010. The current Standings and Ranking system has been in use since the 2010–11 season.

ISU World Standings for single & pair skating and ice dance

Season-end No. 1 skaters 
The remainder of this section are some complete lists, by discipline, of all skaters who are the No. 1 in the season-end world standings ordered chronologically, the numbers of season-end No. 1 skaters by nation, the times as season-end No. 1 by nation, the skaters ordered by the numbers of (consecutive) seasons as season-end No. 1, and the youngest/oldest skaters who are the No. 1 in the season-end world standings.

Men's singles 

Chronological

*Date the free skating of the World Championships was held.

#Date the 2020 World Championships were officially cancelled.

Records and statistics

The following tables show the numbers of season-end No. 1 skaters by nation, and the times as season-end No. 1 by nation.

The following table shows the skaters who are the No. 1 in the season-end world standings ordered by the numbers of seasons as season-end No. 1.

The following table shows the skaters who have been the No. 1 in the season-end world standings for at least two consecutive seasons ordered by the numbers of consecutive seasons as season-end No. 1.

The following table shows the youngest/oldest skaters who are the No. 1 in the season-end world standings.

*Date the free skating of the World Championships was held.

Ladies' singles 

Chronological

*Date the free skating of the World Championships was held.

#Date the 2020 World Championships were officially cancelled.

Records and statistics

The following tables show the numbers of season-end No. 1 skaters by nation, and the times as season-end No. 1 by nation.

The following table shows the skaters who are the No. 1 in the season-end world standings ordered by the numbers of seasons as season-end No. 1.

The following table shows the skaters who have been the No. 1 in the season-end world standings for at least two consecutive seasons ordered by the numbers of consecutive seasons as season-end No. 1.

The following table shows the youngest/oldest skaters who are the No. 1 in the season-end world standings.

*Date the free skating of the World Championships was held.

Pairs 

Chronological

*Date the free skating of the World Championships was held.

#Date the 2020 World Championships were officially cancelled.

Records and statistics

The following tables show the numbers of season-end No. 1 couples by nation, and the times as season-end No. 1 by nation.

The following table shows the couples who are the No. 1 in the season-end world standings ordered by the numbers of seasons as season-end No. 1.

The following table shows the couples who have been the No. 1 in the season-end world standings for at least two consecutive seasons ordered by the numbers of consecutive seasons as season-end No. 1.

The following table shows the youngest/oldest skaters who are the No. 1 in the season-end world standings.

*Date the free skating of the World Championships was held.

Ice dance 

Chronological

*Date the free dance of the World Championships was held.

#Date the 2020 World Championships were officially cancelled.

Records and statistics

The following tables show the numbers of season-end No. 1 couples by nation, and the times as season-end No. 1 by nation.

The following table shows the couples who are the No. 1 in the season-end world standings ordered by the numbers of seasons as season-end No. 1.

The following table shows the couples who have been the No. 1 in the season-end world standings for at least two consecutive seasons ordered by the numbers of consecutive seasons as season-end No. 1.

The following table shows the youngest/oldest skaters who are the No. 1 in the season-end world standings.

*Date the free dance of the World Championships was held.

All disciplines 
Chronological

Records and statistics

The following table shows the numbers of season-end No. 1 skaters/couples by nation.

The following table shows the times as season-end No. 1 by nation.

The following table shows the skaters/couples who are the No. 1 in the season-end world standings ordered by the numbers of seasons as season-end No. 1.

The following table shows the skaters/couples who have been the No. 1 in the season-end world standings for at least two consecutive seasons ordered by the numbers of consecutive seasons as season-end No. 1.

The following table shows the youngest/oldest skaters who are the No. 1 in the season-end world standings.

*Date when the free skating/free dance of the World Championships was held.

Skaters in the top 3 of the season-end world standings 
The remainder of this section are some complete lists, by discipline, of all skaters who are in the top 3 of the season-end world standings ordered chronologically, the numbers of the skaters by nation, the times as season-end No. 1, No. 2, and No. 3 by nation, and the skaters ordered by the sums of the numbers of (consecutive) seasons as season-end No. 1, No. 2, and No. 3.

Men's singles 
Chronological

Records and statistics

The following table shows the numbers of the skaters who are in the top 3 of the season-end World Standings ordered by nation.

The following table shows the times as season-end No. 1, No. 2, and No. 3 by nation.

The following table shows the skaters who are in the top 3 of the season-end World Standings ordered by the sums of the numbers of seasons as season-end No. 1, No. 2, and No. 3.

The following table shows the skaters who have been in the top 3 of the season-end World Standings for at least two consecutive seasons ordered by the sums of the numbers of consecutive seasons as season-end No. 1, No. 2, and No. 3.

Ladies' singles 
Chronological

Records and statistics

The following table shows the numbers of the skaters who are in the top 3 of the season-end World Standings ordered by nation.

The following table shows the times as season-end No. 1, No. 2, and No. 3 by nation.

The following table shows the skaters who are in the top 3 of the season-end World Standings ordered by the sums of the numbers of seasons as season-end No. 1, No. 2, and No. 3.

The following table shows the skaters who have been in the top 3 of the season-end World Standings for at least two consecutive seasons ordered by the sums of the numbers of consecutive seasons as season-end No. 1, No. 2, and No. 3.

Pairs 
Chronological

Records and statistics

The following table shows the numbers of the couples who are in the top 3 of the season-end World Standings ordered by nation.

The following table shows the times as season-end No. 1, No. 2, and No. 3 by nation.

The following table shows the couples who are in the top 3 of the season-end World Standings ordered by the sums of the numbers of seasons as season-end No. 1, No. 2, and No. 3.

The following table shows the couples who have been in the top 3 of the season-end World Standings for at least two consecutive seasons ordered by the sums of the numbers of consecutive seasons as season-end No. 1, No. 2, and No. 3.

Ice dance 
Chronological

Records and statistics

The following table shows the numbers of the couples who are in the top 3 of the season-end World Standings ordered by nation.

The following table shows the times as season-end No. 1, No. 2, and No. 3 by nation.

The following table shows the couples who are in the top 3 of the season-end World Standings ordered by the sums of the numbers of seasons as season-end No. 1, No. 2, and No. 3.

The following table shows the couples who have been in the top 3 of the season-end World Standings for at least two consecutive seasons ordered by the sums of the numbers of consecutive seasons as season-end No. 1, No. 2, and No. 3.

All disciplines 
Records and statistics

The following table shows the numbers of the skaters/couples who are in the top 3 of the season-end World Standings ordered by nation.

The following table shows the times as season-end No. 1, No. 2, and No. 3 by nation.

The following table shows the skaters/couples who have been in the top 3 of the season-end World Standings for at least four seasons ordered by the sums of the numbers of seasons as season-end No. 1, No. 2, and No. 3.

The following table shows the skaters/couples who have been in the top 3 of the season-end World Standings for at least four consecutive seasons ordered by the sums of the numbers of consecutive seasons as season-end No. 1, No. 2, and No. 3.

Highest standing points 
The remainder of this section are some complete lists, by discipline, of all skaters who have received at least 4500 standing points ordered by the points, and the numbers of skaters by nation.

Men's singles 

*Date first received the highest standing points.

†OWG for Olympic Winter Games, WC for World Championships, EC for European Championships, 4CC for Four Continents Championships, GPF for Grand Prix Final.

Totals by nation

The following table shows the numbers of skaters who have received at least 4500 standing points by nation.

Ladies' singles 

*Date first received the highest standing points.

†OWG for Olympic Winter Games, WC for World Championships, EC for European Championships, 4CC for Four Continents Championships, GPF for Grand Prix Final.

Totals by nation

The following table shows the numbers of skaters who have received at least 4500 standing points by nation.

Pairs 

*Date first received the highest standing points.

†OWG for Olympic Winter Games, WC for World Championships, EC for European Championships, 4CC for Four Continents Championships, GPF for Grand Prix Final.

Totals by nation

The following table shows the numbers of couples who have received at least 4500 standing points by nation.

Ice dance 

*Date first received the highest standing points.

†OWG for Olympic Winter Games, WC for World Championships, EC for European Championships, 4CC for Four Continents Championships, GPF for Grand Prix Final.

Totals by nation

The following table shows the numbers of couples who have received at least 4500 standing points by nation.

All disciplines 

*Date first received the highest standing points.

†OWG for Olympic Winter Games, WC for World Championships, EC for European Championships, 4CC for Four Continents Championships, GPF for Grand Prix Final.

Totals by nation

The following table shows the numbers of skaters/couples who have received at least 4500 standing points, and the numbers of disciplines which the skaters/couples are from by nation.

Highest ranked figure skaters by nation

ISU World Standings for synchronized skating

Season-end No. 1 teams 
The remainder of this section is a complete list, by level, of all teams who are the No. 1 in the season-end standings ordered chronologically.

Senior Synchronized

Junior Synchronized

Teams in the top 3 of the season-end Standings 
The remainder of this section is a complete list, by level, of all teams who are in the top 3 of the season-end standings ordered chronologically.

Senior Synchronized

Junior Synchronized

See also 
 Figure skating records and statistics
 ISU World Standings and Season's World Ranking
 List of highest ranked figure skaters by nation
 Major achievements in figure skating by nation

References

External links 
 International Skating Union
 ISU World standings for Single & Pair Skating and Ice Dance / ISU Season's World Ranking
 ISU World standings for Synchronized Skating

ISU World Standings and Season's World Ranking
Standings and Ranking statistics
Standings and Ranking statistics